Serbis on the Go is a public affairs and public service show in the Philippines hosted by Gina dela Vega-Cruz, and aired every Monday evenings on IBC 13. It aired from 2004 to 2008.

Hosts
 Gina dela Vega-Cruz
 Anthony Suntay (2004)

See also
List of Philippine television shows
List of programs previously broadcast by Intercontinental Broadcasting Corporation

Philippine television shows
IBC News and Public Affairs shows
2004 Philippine television series debuts
2008 Philippine television series endings
Intercontinental Broadcasting Corporation original programming
Filipino-language television shows